Robert John "R J" Stewart (born 1949) is a Scottish-born composer, author, and teacher.  He has written over 40 books on occultism, Ceremonial magic and Celtic mythology. His books include a series on the underworld and faery traditions.

From 1980 to 1988, Stewart wrote two books about Merlin, translating and exploring medieval texts on the topic (now published in one volume as Merlin: the Prophetic Vision and Mystic Life, by Penguin Arkana). He also created the Merlin Tarot, (HarperCollins) comprising a book and a deck of cards (painted by Miranda Gray) depicting scenes from ancient Merlin texts. This deck and book have been translated into Japanese, French, Italian, and German.

From 1988 to the present, R J Stewart has taught workshops and classes on Celtic and Classical mythological traditions, music and consciousness. In 1993, he co-wrote Celtic Bards, Celtic Druids, (Published by Cassell, Blandford Press) with harper and storyteller Robin Williamson, founder of The Incredible String Band. 
R J Stewart teaches the Faery (Fairy) Tradition which he has explored in the books: Living World of Faery, Earthlight, Power within the Land and the Well of Light.
This later book has great relevance for the increasingly important practice of "Earth Healing" which has great relevance in our modern-day crisis.
As folk musician “Bob Stewart”, he made famous a folk instrument of his own design referred to on his albums as a ‘concert psaltery’. The instrument is similar to a zither, and has groups of strings laid out left to right, in triad chord groups rather than as chromatic scales. Although this can make the instrument difficult to play at speed, complex chord progressions can be easily interwoven around a basic melody.

Discography
Bob Stewart – The Raggle Taggle Gypsies O
The Journey to the Underworld
The Unique Sound of the Psaltery
Advanced Magical Arts
Calling in the Elements

Bibliography
The Way of Merlin
The Miracle Tree
Living Magical Arts
Advanced Magical Arts
The Underworld Initiation
The Living World of Faery
Power within the Land
Earth Light
The Spiritual Dimensions of Music
Celebrating the Male Mysteries
Celtic Gods, Celtic Goddesses
Walker Between Worlds

References

External links
Stewart's website
Dreampower biography biographical page at Stewart's second website

1949 births
Living people
Scottish composers
Scottish writers